This is a list of films with a significant amount of dialogue in the Mandarin Chinese language.

See also
List of Chinese films
List of Taiwanese films

 
Lists of films by language
Lists of Chinese films